Learning to Flinch is a live solo acoustic album by American singer-songwriter Warren Zevon, recorded at various venues in the United States, Europe, New Zealand, and Australia and released in early 1993.

Zevon's second live album, it featured three new songs ("Worrier King," "Piano Fighter" and "The Indifference of Heaven").

Track listing
All tracks composed by Warren Zevon, except where indicated.
Side one
"Splendid Isolation" – 4:20 – Bogarts, Cincinnati
"Lawyers, Guns and Money" – 3:22 – Paradise, Boston
"Mr. Bad Example" (Jorge Calderón, Zevon) – 3:08 – The Loft, Berlin
"Excitable Boy" (LeRoy Marinell, Zevon) – 2:41 – Tipitina's, New Orleans
"Hasten Down the Wind" – 3:41 – The Town Hall, New York
"The French Inhaler" – 4:22 – Town & Country, London
"Worrier King" – 4:05 – Gluepot, Auckland
"Roland Chorale" (David Lindell, Zevon) – 1:30 – Gluepot, Auckland
"Roland the Headless Thompson Gunner" (Lindell, Zevon) – 11:18 – Sentrum, Oslo
Side two
"Searching for a Heart" – 3:05 – Burswood Casino, Perth
"Boom Boom Mancini" – 3:18 – The Flood Zone, Richmond
"Jungle Work" (Calderón, Zevon) – 4:53 – St. Mary's Leagues Club, St. Mary's
"Piano Fighter" – 4:08 – The Cambridge Hotel, Newcastle
"Werewolves of London" (Marinell, Waddy Wachtel, Zevon) – 4:10 – Town & Country, London
"The Indifference of Heaven" – 4:12 – Biskuithalle, Bonn
"Poor, Poor Pitiful Me" – 9:38 – Big Ticket, Adelaide 
"Play It All Night Long" – 3:49 – Park West, Chicago

Personnel
Warren Zevon – guitar, keyboards, vocals, harmonica

Production
Producers: Warren Zevon, Duncan Aldrich

Charts

References

Warren Zevon live albums
1993 live albums
Giant Records (Warner) live albums